Rugby World Cup records have been accumulating since the first Rugby World Cup tournament was held in 1987.

Team records

Titles

Title win rate

Points

Margins

Tries

Player records

Points 

Key: App = Appearances. Con = conversions. Pen = penalties. Drop = drop goals.

Tries 

Youngest try scorer in a World Cup game
George North, aged  (2 tries v , 26 September 2011)

Oldest try scorer in a World Cup game
Diego Ormaechea, aged  (v , 2 October 1999)

Conversions

Penalty goals

Drop goals

Appearance statistics 

Oldest player to appear in a World Cup match
Diego Ormaechea, aged  (v , 15 October 1999)

Oldest player to appear in a World Cup final
Schalk Brits, aged  (v , 2 November 2019)

Oldest player to win a World Cup final
Schalk Brits, aged  (v , 2 November 2019)

Youngest player to appear in a World Cup match
Vasil Lobzhanidze, aged  (v , 19 September 2015)

Youngest player to appear in a World Cup final
Jonah Lomu, aged  (v , 24 June 1995)

Youngest player to win a World Cup final
François Steyn, aged  (v , 20 October 2007)

By tournament

Note: * denotes an all-time record

Miscellaneous

Winning coaches and captains
A foreign coach has never managed a World Cup-winning team.

Draws

Nil points

Highest attendance
89,267 –  v , 27 September 2015 at Wembley Stadium, London, England, 2015.

Hosting

Eden Park in Auckland Park was the first stadium to host the Rugby World Cup Final twice, with the 1987 and 2011 finals having been held there. Twickenham Stadium also hosted the final twice in 1991 and 2015.
The record for the city that has been a part of most Rugby World Cups is currently four and is held by Cardiff that hosted matches in 1991, 1999, 2007 and 2015. Edinburgh and Toulouse hosted matches in three tournaments. If the definition of "city" includes its metropolitan area, Paris has also hosted matches in three tournaments. The city of Paris hosted matches in 1991, its adjacent suburb of Saint-Denis hosted matches in 1999, and both cities hosted matches in 2007.

Head-to-head

The highest number of head-to-head matches between two nations currently stands at seven meetings, encompassing five teams (Australia, England, France, New Zealand, and Wales) in three Rugby World Cup rivalries. On the other end of the table, there are currently sixty-eight head-to-head meetings involving one game between two nations. The following table lists the head-to-head statistics of the Rugby World Cup, ranging from the inaugural tournament in 1987 to the latest tournament in 2019. It is organised first numerically, with the more head-to-head meetings appearing at the top of the table and the less number of meetings, such as one meeting between two nations appearing at the bottom of the table, and second, alphabetically by teams.

Tier 1 Nations Head-to-Head 

The table below shows the current dominance in the Head-to-Head meetings of tier 1 nations at the Rugby World Cup from the first tournament in 1987 to the latest tournament in 2019. Currently, New Zealand has the best record amongst the other tier 1 nations, achieving more wins and culminating in a superior Head-to-Head record over eight other tier 1 nations, and equal with one other (Australia). Italy is at the bottom of the table, and has an inferior Head-to-Head record with eight other tier 1 nations, and parity with one other nation (Argentina). There are three tier 1 Head-to-Head meetings that have never been played at a Rugby World Cup: England versus Ireland, Ireland versus South Africa, and Scotland versus Wales.

Trivia
England became the first sole host nation to be eliminated in the pool stage of a Rugby World Cup in 2015. Wales, as joint hosts, were eliminated in the pool stage in 1991.
Three match-ups have occurred twice in the same World Cup:
2007 Argentina defeated France in the opening match 17–12, and went on to beat them 34–10 in the bronze final. 
2007 South Africa defeated England 36–0 in the pool stage, and went on to play them in the final, winning 15–6. 
2011 New Zealand defeated France 37–17 in the pool stage, and went on to play them in the final, winning 8–7.
Jonny Wilkinson, with 15 points in 2003 and 6 points in 2007, is the only player to have scored points in two Rugby World Cup Finals.
Three nations have reached a Rugby World Cup Final having previously lost a game in that tournament: England in 1991 and 2007, South Africa in 2019, and France in 2011, the latter being the only team to reach the final having lost two games and South Africa being the only team who won the cup after losing one game
The teams involved in the most World Cup opening matches are Argentina and New Zealand. The Pumas participated in the first three World Cup openers of the professional era – losing to Wales and Australia in 1999 and 2003 respectively, and defeating France in 2007. The All Blacks defeated Italy in 1987, England in 1991, and Tonga in 2011.
No player scored a conversion in a Rugby World Cup Final between Matt Burke of Australia in 1999 and François Trinh-Duc of France in 2011. Both Jonny Wilkinson and Elton Flatley failed with their sole conversion attempts in 2003, and no tries were scored in 2007's final.
France, Australia and New Zealand are the only nations to have made it to at least the quarter-finals of every Rugby World Cup. Furthermore, South Africa have also done so since they started participating in 1995.
France is the only non English-speaking country to have made it to a Rugby World Cup final – in 1987, 1999 and 2011. It is also the only country to reach a final without ever winning it.
The only Tier Two countries to have participated in every Rugby World Cup are Canada and Japan, with Canada making it to one quarter-final in 1991 and Japan proceeding to the quarter finals in 2019.
Japan is the only team to have ever won three matches and not progressed beyond the pool stage, losing out to South Africa and Scotland in their pool by points difference in 2015.
Of the Tier One nations, Italy is the only one not to have made it to at least the quarter-finals in any Rugby World Cup. Conversely, four Tier Two countries have made it to the quarter-finals – Fiji in 1987 and 2007, Samoa (then called Western Samoa) in 1991 and 1995, Canada in 1991 and Japan in 2019.
The 2015 final between Australia and New Zealand is the highest scoring Rugby World Cup final ever, with New Zealand winning that match 34–17.
After the 2015 final, New Zealand became the first team to win the Rugby World Cup three times, and the first team to have successfully defended its title.
Wales have had the most upsets in the Rugby World Cup, having lost to Samoa both in 1991 and 1999, then losing to Fiji in 2007. Other major upsets include Ireland and Scotland losing to Japan in 2019, France losing to Tonga in 2011 and South Africa losing to Japan in 2015.
South Africa became the first nation to win a World Cup after losing a match in the pool stage in 2019.
South Africa is the only country not to concede a try in the finals. All other teams have conceded at least one try during one of the finals.
There are three tier 1 Head-to-Head meetings that have never been played at a Rugby World Cup: England versus Ireland, Ireland versus South Africa, and Scotland versus Wales.

See also

List of rugby union playing countries
List of Rugby World Cup hat-tricks
Rugby World Cup try scorers
Rugby World Cup Overall Record
National team appearances in the Rugby World Cup
List of winners of multiple Rugby World Cups
List of Rugby World Cup finals
Rugby World Cup
International rugby union team records
International rugby union player records

References

External links
All Time RWC Team Statistics on Rugbyworldcup.com
All Time RWC Player Statistics on Rugbyworldcup.com
IRB Rugby World Cup Records on Espnscrum.com

Rugby World Cup
World Cup